Adelgunde is a German female name. It may refer to:

 Princess Adelgunde of Bavaria (1823–1914)
 Princess Adelgunde of Bavaria (1870–1958)
 647 Adelgunde, an asteroid in the asteroid belt